Avner Mandelman is an Israeli-Canadian businessman and writer. His debut novel The Debba, published in 2010, won the 2011 Arthur Ellis Award for Best First Novel, and was a longlisted nominee for the 2010 Scotiabank Giller Prize.

A financial industry manager in Toronto, Ontario, Mandelman has also published two short story collections and the investment guide The Sleuth Investor. His short story collection Talking to the Enemy won the first Sophie Brody Award for outstanding achievement in Jewish literature from the American Library Association in 2006. Talking to the Enemy, containing stories featured in The Best American Short Stories and Pushcart Prize Stories, was recognized as a Best Book of 2005 by Kirkus Reviews and won the J. I. Segal Award for Fiction in 2000.

Works
Talking to the Enemy (1998)
Cuckoo (2004)
The Sleuth Investor (2007)
The Debba (2010)

References

External links
Avner Mandelman

Canadian male novelists
21st-century Canadian novelists
Canadian male short story writers
Canadian finance and investment writers
Israeli emigrants to Canada
Israeli Jews
Jewish Canadian writers
Businesspeople from Toronto
Writers from Toronto
Living people
21st-century Canadian short story writers
21st-century Canadian male writers
Canadian male non-fiction writers
Year of birth missing (living people)